The Continental Iron Works was an American shipbuilding and engineering company founded in Greenpoint, Brooklyn, in 1861 by Thomas F. Rowland. It is best known for building a number of monitor warships for the United States Navy during the American Civil War, most notably the first of the type, . Monitors successful neutralization of the Confederate ironclad CSS Virginia in the 1862 Battle of Hampton Roads—the world's first battle between ironclad warships—would come to heavily influence American naval strategy both during and after the war.

After the Civil War, a severe shipbuilding slump in New York persuaded the Continental Works to diversify into the manufacture of equipment for the growing gas lighting industry, for which the company built gas holders, gas mains and complete gas plants. In 1888, the company built what was then the largest gas holder in the United States. Another notable achievement of the company in the 1880s was the construction of the country's first steel-hulled ferryboats.

In the 1870s, the Continental Works became a pioneer in welding technology, and many innovative welded products would subsequently be produced by it, such as welded corrugated boiler furnaces for ships and other applications, gas-illuminated buoys, steel digesters for wood pulping and welded casings for torpedoes. The company supplied corrugated boiler furnaces for a number of warships, including the battleship , and its welding expertise was showcased at the World's Columbian Exposition in 1893 and the St. Louis World's Fair in 1904.

During World War I, the Continental Works built munitions for the war effort, including depth charge casings, and after the war, it increasingly turned to the manufacture of gas mains and large-diameter welded water pipes. The company's assets were liquidated in 1928, following the retirement of the founder's son.

History

Establishment  
 thumb | left | upright | Thomas F. Rowland  
In 1851, New York shipbuilder Samuel Sneden relocated his shipyard from Manhattan to Greenpoint, becoming one of the first in his industry to do so. His new yard was located at the foot of West and Calyer Streets, just north of Bushwick Inlet. Over the next decade, Sneden would produce a substantial number of wooden-hulled steamboats and other vessels at this yard, both under his own name and, during the mid-1850s, in partnership with a young shipbuilder named E. S. Whitlock.

In 1859, James L. Day, agent of the New Orleans & Mobile Mail Line and a repeat customer of Sneden's, requested that the shipbuilder construct an iron-hulled steamer for his company. Having no experience in the construction of iron hulls, Sneden took a young engineer named Thomas F. Rowland into temporary partnership in his firm, Samuel Sneden & Co., to assist in the project. Some basic ironworking facilities, including a forge, punch and shears, were acquired by the firm, which in 1859–1861 completed three iron-hulled steamers, including that for Day's steamboat line.

Seeking to further capitalize on its investment in ironworking equipment, Samuel Sneden & Co. submitted a bid in 1860 for the construction of a quarter-mile long, large-diameter iron pipeline across the Harlem River at Highbridge, Bronx, for the transport of water from the Croton Aqueduct to a newly built reservoir in Manhattan. Sneden & Co. won the contract with a bid of $49,000—almost $20,000 less than the next lowest bid. A month after signing the contract, Sneden requested its voiding on the grounds of the intervening delay, but was refused on the basis that the wait had not been excessive. Shortly thereafter, Sneden declared himself insolvent, and ceded his shipyard to his partner Rowland, who pledged to settle the failed company's outstanding business.

Having gained control of the shipyard, Rowland renamed it the Continental Iron Works. The waterworks contract would later be successfully completed by the new company.

American Civil War 
 thumb|Puritan on the ways at the Continental Iron Works 
The establishment of the Continental Iron Works in early 1861 coincided with the outbreak of the American Civil War, which began in April of that year. In May, Rowland traveled to Washington, D.C., to present the Navy Department with conceptual plans for a screw-propelled ironclad with revolving gun turrets. His proposal was rejected as unfeasible, but he did manage to secure contracts for the manufacture of gun carriages, and for fitting out of merchant ships purchased by the Navy for war use. He also received a contract for the construction of mortar beds for Commander David Dixon Porter's fleet of mortar schooners,  which would later see action in the Battle of Forts Jackson and St. Philip.

In September, New York engineer John Ericsson presented the Navy with a proposal to build a radically new type of ironclad warship with a low freeboard and revolving gun turret. On 4 October, he signed a contract with the Navy for construction of the new vessel, on the basis that Ericsson and his backers would assume all financial risk for the project and that the ship would be launched within 100 days.

As Ericsson wanted to closely supervise the project, he turned to local New York companies for the ship's construction. For the engines, he enlisted the services of his friend, Cornelius H. Delamater, proprietor of the Delamater Works, while for the turret, he subcontracted with the Novelty Iron Works—the only facility in the country then capable of bending its thick armor plates. For the hull, the Continental Iron Works, as one of the few New York-based companies with recent expertise in iron shipbuilding, was an obvious choice, and a contract to build the ship was signed by Rowland and Ericsson on 25 October. 
 thumb|left | A double planer invented by Rowland for fast planing of armor plate 
The new ironclad, named , was launched at the Continental Works in just 101 days (although Monitor was delivered a day later than the term specified in the contract, the Navy chose to waive any penalty). The ironclad was dispatched immediately after completion to Hampton Roads, Virginia, where the Confederate ironclad CSS Virginia was threatening the Union fleet. Monitors success in neutralizing the threat from Virginia in the ensuing Battle of Hampton Roads—the world's first battle between ironclads—sparked a "monitor fever" in Washington, and contracts for many more of the same ship type, dubbed monitors after the original, were quickly signed. All would see service during the war with the exception of the largest, Puritan, completion of which was delayed by design changes and unavailability of the main armament, and Cohoes, the design of which was botched by the Navy. The Continental Iron Works also secured contracts during the war for construction of the turrets of another three monitors, and additionally built the iron-hulled double-ended gunboat .

In the course of building the monitors, Continental's proprietor, Thomas Rowland, invented a number of new machine tools to expedite the work, one of which is said to have reduced the required workforce for a particular task by 75 men. He also developed new working methods, such as heating armor plates before bending them. By the end of the war, the Works covered an area of eight acres, and is said to have been so crammed with buildings and wood and iron stores that movement around the yard by its employees had become both difficult and hazardous. At its peak, the firm's wartime workforce was in the order of 1,000 employees.

Postwar diversification 

With the end of the war in 1865, the American shipbuilding industry entered a severe and prolonged slump, caused partly by the Navy dumping a large number of ships now surplus to its requirements on the market, and partly by economic changes brought about by the conflict. The New York region was particularly badly affected, with many of its most prominent shipbuilding and marine engineering plants leaving the business. 
 thumb | Continental Iron Works advertisement for gas holders  
Shipbuilding contracts for the Continental Works also declined sharply, but the firm had done better during the war than some other Naval contractors, and was evidently in a more sound financial position. More importantly, while the company continued to accept shipbuilding contracts when available, it began to diversify its business into other areas. The most important of these initially was the burgeoning gasworks industry, driven by the growing demand for gas lighting. Over the next few decades, the Continental Works would supply gas equipment to the industry throughout the Eastern United States, including gas mains, giant telescopic gas holders and complete gas plant installations. For one company alone, for example, the Consolidated Gas Company, the Continental Works built three gas plants in New York City, and supplied a gas holder for a fourth that at the time was the country's largest, described by the American Society of Mechanical Engineers as "a noted achievement in gas engineering".

A wide variety of other metal products was also produced by the Continental Works through the 1870s, such as giant cauldrons and vats, machine tools, lifecars for lifesaving clubs, and torpedo casings for the Navy. In 1869, the company accepted a contract to build a swing bridge, of the bowstring girder type, across Bushwick Inlet. The bridge, designed by Rowland himself and capable of sustaining a rolling load of 60 tons or distributed load of 300, was completed by 1872.

Postwar shipbuilding  
 thumb|Hull of  after reassembly in California at the Burgess yard, c. 1880 
While the company secured only a handful of shipbuilding contracts after the Civil War, it nonetheless built a number of notable vessels during this period. In 1871 for example, the company built the composite steam yacht Day Dream for Pacific Mail founder William Henry Aspinwall. Designed by Continental employee Lucius A. Smith, it was one of the first steam yachts built in the United States.

In 1874, the Continental Works declined an offer from the Navy Department to build a new monitor, due to the terms of the proposed contract. Shortly thereafter, however, New York engineer Phineas Burgess took the contract for the new Amphitrite-class monitor , and Continental then accepted a subcontract from him to build the ship's hull. It was duly constructed by Continental at Greenpoint, before being knocked down into sections for transportation overland to Vallejo, California, to be reassembled by Burgess. Construction of the vessel was subsequently suspended by government indecision—causing great financial loss to Burgess in the process—and was only finally completed in 1896 at the Mare Island Navy Yard.

In 1884–1885, the Continental Works built the ferryboats Atlantic and Brooklyn for New York's Union Ferry Company; these were the first two steel-hulled ferryboats built in the United States.

Welding pioneer 

In 1876, the Continental Iron Works became a pioneer in welding technology when it successfully applied plate-welding techniques to the boiler furnaces of the monitor USS Monadnock. Another early application of the company's welding techniques was the manufacture of gas reservoirs used to store highly pressurized gas in self-propelled torpedoes, a weapon type that at the time was the subject of increasing experimentation by the Russian and other European governments. The Continental Works later pioneered scarf- and gas-welding, with welded products gradually growing to become a mainstay of the company's business. The company exhibited its welding expertise at the World's Columbian Exposition in 1893 and again at the St. Louis World's Fair in 1904.

By the 1890s, the company had become the nation's sole producer of welded, corrugated boiler furnaces, which were used in both marine and stationary boilers. The advantage of corrugation was that it could provide the same strength as a conventional furnace but with thinner walls, increasing the transfer of heat and thus efficiency. These corrugated furnaces were a popular product and were adopted on many merchant ships, as well as US Navy torpedo boats and other warships, such as the battleship . The company built the first Thornycroft boilers in the United States—for the Navy's first torpedo boat, —as well as manufacturing its own line of boilers. Other popular welded products produced by the company through to the beginning of World War I included gas-illuminated buoys, and steel digesters used to convert wood to pulp for paper-making. During the Spanish–American War of 1898, the company produced thousands of torpedo casings for the Navy.

World War I and after 

During World War I, the Continental Iron Works manufactured welded depth charge casings and other munitions for the war effort. After the war, the company continued to produce buoys and furnaces, but increasingly turned to the manufacture of gas mains and large-diameter welded water pipes for the bulk of its business. The latter product had a number of advantages over riveted pipes, including smooth interior surfaces, lessening water friction, and reduced leakage.

In 1907, Thomas F. Rowland, the company's founder and president since its inception in 1861, died, the presidency of the firm passing to vice-president Warren E. Hill. Hill died in 1908, and Rowland's son, Thomas F. Rowland Jr., became president. Rowland Jr. retired in 1928, at which time the business was liquidated. The company's machine tools for the manufacture of corrugated boiler furnaces were purchased by the American Welding Company, after which, the defunct firm's site lay idle for some years. It was later partly occupied by a lumber yard and a fuel company. As of 2020, the site was again idle.

Shipbuilding record

Samuel Sneden & Co. 

The following table lists the iron-hulled ships built by Samuel Sneden & Co. from 1859 to 1861, when Rowland was a partner in the firm. Though not strictly speaking part of the output of the Continental Iron Works, they were built with the expertise of Rowland, at the yard that would later become the Continental Works, and are included here for the sake of completeness.

United States Navy warships 

The Continental Iron Works built a total of eight warships for the United States Navy during the Civil War—seven monitors and one gunboat. Two of the monitors were not completed by war's end and consequently never commissioned.

Other notable United States Navy warship contracts 

In addition to the United States Navy warships built by the Continental Iron Works, it also built the gun turrets for three other monitors during the Civil War, and later, in the 1870s, the hull of another, which was later completed at other shipyards.

Post-Civil War shipbuilding record 

The Continental Works built a small number of ships in the decades after the Civil War, most of which were merchant vessels of one kind or another.

Footnotes

References

Bibliography  
  
  
 
  
  
  
  
  
  
  
  
  
  
 
 
 
  
 

1861 establishments in New York (state)
1928 disestablishments in New York (state)
Defunct shipbuilding companies of the United States
Defunct marine engineering companies of New York City
Greenpoint, Brooklyn
American companies disestablished in 1928
American companies established in 1861
Manufacturing companies established in 1861